All units of the Canadian Armed Forces have an order of precedence that determines seniority; it often decides such matters as which unit forms up to the right (senior side) of other units on a ceremonial parade, or the order in which marches or calls are played at a mess dinner.

Order of precedence

 Naval Operations Branch
 Royal Canadian Armoured Corps (see below)
 Royal Canadian Artillery
 Canadian Military Engineers
 Communications and Electronics Branch
 Royal Canadian Infantry Corps (see below)
 Air Operations Branch
 Royal Canadian Logistics Service
 Royal Canadian Medical Service
 Royal Canadian Dental Corps
 Corps of Royal Canadian Electrical and Mechanical Engineers
 Royal Canadian Chaplain Service
 Canadian Forces Military Police
 Legal Branch
 Music Branch
 Personnel Selection Branch
 Training Development Branch
 Public Affairs Branch
 Intelligence Branch
 Cadet Instructors Cadre

Note: The honour of "the right of the line" (precedence over other units), on an army parade, is held by the units of the Royal Canadian Horse Artillery (RCHA) when on parade with their guns. On dismounted parades, RCHA units take precedence over all other land force units except formed bodies of officer cadets of the Royal Military College representing their college. Royal Canadian Artillery units parade to the left of units of the Royal Canadian Armoured Corps.

Precedence of armoured regiments

Regular Force
 The Royal Canadian Dragoons
 Lord Strathcona's Horse (Royal Canadians)
 12e Régiment blindé du Canada (Regular)

Primary Reserve
 The Governor General's Horse Guards
 The Halifax Rifles (RCAC)
 8th Canadian Hussars (Princess Louise's)
 The Ontario Regiment (RCAC)
 The Queen's York Rangers (1st American Regiment) (RCAC)
 Sherbrooke Hussars
 12e Régiment blindé du Canada (Militia)
 1st Hussars
 The Prince Edward Island Regiment (RCAC)
 The Royal Canadian Hussars (Montreal)
 The British Columbia Regiment (Duke of Connaught's Own)
 The South Alberta Light Horse
 The Saskatchewan Dragoons
 The King's Own Calgary Regiment (RCAC)
 The British Columbia Dragoons
 The Fort Garry Horse
 Le Régiment de Hull (RCAC)
 The Windsor Regiment (RCAC)

Supplementary Reserve 

 4th Princess Louise Dragoon Guards
 12th Manitoba Dragoons
 14th Canadian Hussars

Precedence of infantry regiments

Regular Force
 The Royal Canadian Regiment (Regular)
 Princess Patricia's Canadian Light Infantry (Regular)
 Royal 22e Régiment (Regular)

Primary Reserve
 Governor General's Foot Guards
 The Canadian Grenadier Guards
 The Queen's Own Rifles of Canada
 The Black Watch (Royal Highland Regiment) of Canada
 Les Voltigeurs de Québec
 The Royal Regiment of Canada
 The Royal Hamilton Light Infantry (Wentworth Regiment)
 The Princess of Wales' Own Regiment
 The Hastings and Prince Edward Regiment
 The Lincoln and Welland Regiment
 4th Battalion, The Royal Canadian Regiment
 The Royal Highland Fusiliers of Canada
 The Grey and Simcoe Foresters
 The Lorne Scots (Peel, Dufferin and Halton Regiment)
 The Brockville Rifles
 Stormont, Dundas and Glengarry Highlanders
 Les Fusiliers du St-Laurent
 Le Régiment de la Chaudière
 Royal 22e Régiment (Militia)
 4th Battalion, Royal 22e Régiment (Châteauguay)
 6th Battalion, Royal 22e Régiment
 Les Fusiliers Mont-Royal
 The Princess Louise Fusiliers
 The Royal New Brunswick Regiment
 The West Nova Scotia Regiment
 The North Shore Regiment
 The Nova Scotia Highlanders
 Le Régiment de Maisonneuve
 The Cameron Highlanders of Ottawa (Duke of Edinburgh's Own)
 The Royal Winnipeg Rifles
 The Essex and Kent Scottish
 48th Highlanders of Canada
 Le Régiment du Saguenay
 The Cape Breton Highlanders
 The Algonquin Regiment (Northern Pioneers)
 The Argyll and Sutherland Highlanders of Canada (Princess Louise's)
 The Lake Superior Scottish Regiment
 The North Saskatchewan Regiment
 The Royal Regina Rifles
 The Rocky Mountain Rangers
 The Loyal Edmonton Regiment (4th Battalion, Princess Patricia's Canadian Light Infantry)
 The Queen's Own Cameron Highlanders of Canada
 The Royal Westminster Regiment
 The Calgary Highlanders
 Les Fusiliers de Sherbrooke
 The Seaforth Highlanders of Canada
 The Canadian Scottish Regiment (Princess Mary's)
 The Royal Montreal Regiment
 The Irish Regiment of Canada
 The Toronto Scottish Regiment
 Royal Newfoundland Regiment

Supplementary Reserve 

 The Canadian Guards
 Victoria Rifles of Canada
 The Royal Rifles of Canada
 The Perth Regiment
 Le Régiment de Joliette
 The Winnipeg Grenadiers
 The South Saskatchewan Regiment
 The Yukon Regiment

See also

Canadian order of precedence
Canadian order of precedence (decorations and medals)

References

 THE HONOURS, FLAGS AND HERITAGE STRUCTURE OF THE CANADIAN FORCES, 1999
 COMMUNICATIONS & ELECTRONICS BRANCH STANDING ORDERS, 2020

Canadian Armed Forces
Orders of precedence in Canada